Khademiyeh (also Romanized as Khādemīyeh; also known as Khān Nesā (Persian: خان نسا)) is a village in Dehaj Rural District, Dehaj District, Shahr-e Babak County, Kerman Province, Iran. At the 2006 census, its population was 13, in 4 families.

References 

Populated places in Shahr-e Babak County